Sümeyye Özcan may refer to:
 Sümeyye Özcan (Paralympian) (born 1992), Turkish middle distance runner and goalball player
 Sümeyye Özcan (footballer) (born 2001), Liechtensteiner footballer